LADSPA is an acronym for Linux Audio Developer's Simple Plugin API. It is an application programming interface (API) standard for handling audio filters and audio signal processing effects, licensed under LGPL-2.1-or-later. It was originally designed for Linux through consensus on the Linux Audio Developers Mailing List, but works on a variety of other platforms. It is used in many free audio software projects and there is a wide range of LADSPA plug-ins available.

LADSPA exists primarily as a header file written in the programming language C.

There are many audio plugin standards and most major modern software synthesizers and sound editors support a variety. The best known standard is probably Steinberg's Virtual Studio Technology. LADSPA is unusual in that it attempts to provide only the "Greatest Common Divisor" of other standards. This means that its scope is limited, but it is simple and plugins written using it are easy to embed in many other programs. The standard has changed little with time, so compatibility problems are rare.

DSSI extends LADSPA to cover instrument plugins.

LV2 is a successor, based on LADSPA and DSSI, but permitting easy extensibility, allowing custom user interfaces, MIDI messages, and custom extensions.

Competing technologies 
Apple Inc.'s Audio Units
Digidesign's Real Time AudioSuite
Avid Technology's Avid Audio eXtension
Microsoft's DirectX plugin
Steinberg's Virtual Studio Technology
CLever Audio Plug-in (Open Source)

References

External links 

 ladspa.org

Application programming interfaces
Free audio software
Free software programmed in C
Music software plugin architectures
Linux APIs
Audio libraries